Jigawa State House of Assembly  of Jigawa State is  a branch of the Government inaugurated on 14 December 1991 which serves as the legislative house where all legislative decisions and lawmaking for the governance of Jigawa State is emanating. It is a unicameral body with 30 members elected into 30 state constituencies. The fundamental functions of the Assembly are to enact new laws, amend or repeal existing laws and oversight of the executive. Members of the assembly are elected for a term of four years concurrent with federal legislators (Senate and House of Representatives).

Functions 
The purpose of the House of Assembly is to "provide information on the scope of responsibilities, services and commitment for the entire people of Jigawa State". Their vision is to be "the leading light and pathfinder for Nigerian legislatures", and their mission is to make laws that will ensure good governance, representing the will of its citizens and in the process ensuring judicious use of the resources of the state in order for the citizens  to receive maximum benefit.

The Jigawa State House of Assembly was created to provide certain services for the good of its citizens. Each service has various standards that must be met; for example, whenever the appropriation of a bill is passed on to the house they must ensure that estimates are critically analysed and resources are distributed in such a way those in need are put in priority. They must also ensure that the money budgeted is efficiently utilized judiciously as intended. When it comes to law making, the House of Assembly must ensure the laws are passed with the positive interest of its citizens at heart. The laws must also be practical and implementable over a long period of time.[4] In the case of legitimizing of a political candidate for office the House of Assembly must pick an individual who is well qualified and possesses the skills needed for the position. Members of the public are allowed to express their opinions of this candidate in the House of Assembly form petitions and all these petitions must be read and put into consideration before appointing the candidate for a public office. When members of the public send in petitions to the House of Assembly regarding various issues, the Committee Secretary of the House of Assembly is given a 48-hour limit to respond to these petitions leaving behind his name, position and contact information. Formal petitions will receive responses within two weeks of the day it was issued. 

The House of Assembly recognizes that every citizen of Jigawa state  has the right to peacefully protest, therefore part of the House of Assembly's responsibility is to ensure that the citizens' rights are protected. Furthermore, the House of Assembly is entrusted with the responsibility of overseeing the activities of ministries, departments and agencies (MDA's), through committees. These committees conduct semi-annually and annually inspections on the books of MDA's in order to ensure they are complying with the rules and laws that have been put in place; any defiance of the law is punished accordingly. Lastly, another service they provide is publication of hazards, these are word for word reports of the proceedings in the House of Assembly and they are made available to the general public for a fixed fee.

Composition

Members of the Jigawa State House of Assembly
The Jigawa State House of Assembly consists of 30 elected representatives from each constituency

Reference

External links 

 https://www.jigawastate.gov.ng/state-asembly_1.php
 https://www.premiumtimesng.com/regional/nnorth-east/319181-its-official-apc-wins-all-30-state-assembly-seats-in-jigawa.html
 https://www.pmnewsnigeria.com/2019/06/13/jigawa-assemby-garba-emerges-speaker-for-3rd-time-in-4-yrs/

State legislatures of Nigeria
Politics of Jigawa State